Rudy Doliscat (born November 16, 1967 in Port-au-Prince, Haïti) is a former professional Canadian soccer defender.

Club career
Doliscat made his pro debut in the Canadian Soccer League with the Montreal Supra. After the team folded he joined the Montreal Impact. He was a member of the Impact's inaugural edition in 1993, where he played 20 games. He was the first Impact player to commit a foul in club history on May 14, 1993 against Los Angeles Salsa. In 1994, he was part of the team's starting eleven when the Impact beat the Colorado Foxes 1–0 in the playoff final and won the League Championship. He was the championship MVP.

In 1996, he was one of the five defenders to take part in at least 20 games and help Montreal post the best defence in the league with 18 goals allowed in 27 games, a club record at the time.  During the 1995-1996 indoor season, Doliscat played for the Buffalo Blizzard of the National Professional Soccer League.  He was named First Team All Rookie.  In 1997, Doliscat played for the Sacramento Knights in the Continental Indoor Soccer League.  He returned to the Impact that fall to play for the team in the NPSL.  He remained with the Impact for the outdoor season.  In 1999 when Montreal's new ownership chose not to play the 1999 outdoor season in order to better prepare the 1999-2000 indoor season, he joined arch-rivals the Toronto Lynx. Leaving Montreal with 3 Regular-Season Titles in 1995, 1996, 1997 and one League Championship, and playing a total of 79 games and scoring 3 goals.

In 1999 Doliscat played his last season in the USL First Division with the Toronto where he played 18 games and recorded 3 assists.  He then moved to the Philadelphia KiXX for the 1999-2000 indoor season.

International career
Doliscat made his debut for Canada in an April 1992 friendly match against China and went on to earn 5 caps, scoring 1 goal, which gave Canada a draw against Morocco in a World Cup preparation match in June 1994.

His final international was a January 1995 Sky Dome Cup game against Portugal.

International goals
Scores and results list Canada's goal tally first.

Coaching career
Once he retired he was named head coach of the Canada national soccer team for the Francophone Games in 2005. But Canada was eliminated from Francophone Games after losing all three of their games. After his unsuccessful stint as coach he became technical assistant director at the Quebec Soccer Federation and as well is a soccer analyst for the RDS sports network.

Honours
American Professional Soccer League: 1
 1994

References

External links
Player profile of Rudy Doliscat - Montreal Impact

 

Living people
1967 births
Sportspeople from Port-au-Prince
Soccer players from Montreal
Haitian emigrants to Canada
Haitian Quebecers
Naturalized citizens of Canada
Keene State College alumni
Cincinnati Silverbacks players
Continental Indoor Soccer League players
Black Canadian soccer players
Buffalo Blizzard players
Association football defenders
Canadian soccer players
Canadian expatriate soccer players
Canada men's international soccer players
Montreal Supra players
Montreal Impact (1992–2011) players
National Professional Soccer League (1984–2001) players
Philadelphia KiXX (NPSL) players
Sacramento Knights players
Toronto Lynx players
Canadian Soccer League (1987–1992) players
American Professional Soccer League players
A-League (1995–2004) players
Canadian soccer coaches
Expatriate soccer players in the United States
Canadian expatriate sportspeople in the United States